Zhong Feng Wang is an engineer at Broadcom Corporation in Irvine, California. He was named a Fellow of the Institute of Electrical and Electronics Engineers (IEEE) in 2016 for his contributions to VLSI design and implementation of forward error correction coding.

References 

Fellow Members of the IEEE
Living people
21st-century American engineers
Year of birth missing (living people)
Place of birth missing (living people)